Vladimir Vladimirovich Rykov (born 13 November 1987) is a Russian professional football player who plays as centre-back for FC Rodina Moscow.

Club career

Career statistics

External links
 

1987 births
Sportspeople from Novosibirsk
Living people
Russian footballers
Russia national football B team footballers
Association football defenders
FC Sibir Novosibirsk players
FC SKA-Khabarovsk players
FC Smena Komsomolsk-na-Amure players
FC Orenburg players
FC Saturn Ramenskoye players
FC KAMAZ Naberezhnye Chelny players
FC Volga Nizhny Novgorod players
FC Dynamo Moscow players
FC Tom Tomsk players
FC Torpedo Moscow players
FC Mordovia Saransk players
FC Ural Yekaterinburg players
Russian Premier League players
Russian First League players
Russian Second League players